Tikkar (also called Nawar Valley) is a sub-tehsil which falls under Rohru tehsil in Shimla district of Himachal Pradesh state, India. The area pin code is 171203 and the postal head office is situated at Tikkar town. Tikkar is surrounded by Nankhari Tehsil towards the west, Chauhara Tehsil towards the north, Jubbal Kotkhai Tehsil towards the west. Shimla, Solan, Nahan, Kalka are the nearby cities from here. It comes under Shimla parliamentary constituency for Lok Sabha and Jubbal Kotkhai assembly constituency for Himachal Pradesh Vidhan Sabha.

Nearby villages include Badshal, Samra, Daroti, Khangta, Gujandli, Kashani, Thana, Dhanoti, etc.

During the British Raj, the area was ruled by the Rajas of princely state of Bushahr and the area came under Simla Hill States of Punjab province. Pahari is the local language of the area. Traditional clothing of the area includes Bushahri Topi headgear and Rezta gown. Nati is the folk dance here.

References

Villages in Shimla district